Tattinsky District (Taatta uluuha) is an administrative and municipal district (raion, or ulus), one of the thirty-four in the Sakha Republic, Russia. It is located in the eastern central part of the republic and borders with Tomponsky District in the north and east, Ust-Maysky District in the south, Churapchinsky District in the southwest, and with Ust-Aldansky District in the northwest. Its administrative center is the rural locality (a selo) of Ytyk-Kyuyol. Population:  16,601 (2002 Census);  The population of Ytyk-Kyuyol accounts for 39.6% of the district's total population.

Geography
The landscape of the district is mostly flat. Its main rivers include the Amga, the Aldan and the Tatta, a tributary of the latter.

Climate

History
The district was established on May 25, 1930. Until 1990, it was called Alexeyevsky.

Demographics
As of the 1989 Census, the ethnic composition was as follows:
Yakuts: 95.2%
Russians: 2.3%
Evenks: 0.3%
Evens: 0.2%
other ethnicities: 1.9%

Economy
The economy of the district is mostly based on agriculture.

Inhabited localities

Divisional source:

*Administrative centers are shown in bold

References

Notes

Sources

Districts of the Sakha Republic
States and territories established in 1930